Lentibacillus halophilus is a Gram-positive, strictly aerobic, extremely halophilic and spore-forming bacterium from the genus of Lentibacillus which has been isolated from Nam pla.

References

Bacillaceae
Bacteria described in 2006